The 2017 Utah State Aggies football team represented Utah State University in the 2017 NCAA Division I FBS football season. The Aggies were led by fifth-year head coach Matt Wells and played their home games at Merlin Olsen Field at Maverik Stadium. They competed as members of the Mountain Division of the Mountain West Conference. They finished the season 6–7, 4–4 in Mountain West play to finish in a tie for fourth place in the Mountain Division. They were invited to the Arizona Bowl where they lost to New Mexico State.

Coaching staff

Coaching changes
Utah State hired David Yost as offensive coordinator on December 30, 2016. Yost had previously been the quarterbacks coach at Oregon. Both of the co-offensive coordinators from 2016 remain on staff; Jovon Bouknight as Outside Receivers Coach, and Luke Wells as the Tight Ends/Inside Receivers Coach.

Coaches

Source:

Schedule
Utah State's 2017 football schedule was announced on March 2, 2017. The Aggies will play three straight home games for the first time since 1997, in a stretch that includes in-state rival BYU, Colorado State, and rival Wyoming.

Source:

Game summaries

at Wisconsin

Idaho State

at Wake Forest

at San Jose State

BYU

Colorado State

Wyoming

at UNLV

Boise State

at New Mexico

Hawaii

at Air Force

vs New Mexico State–Arizona Bowl

References

Utah State
Utah State Aggies football seasons
Utah State Aggies football